Langlingen is a municipality in the district of Celle, in Lower Saxony, Germany.

References

Celle (district)